Me First and the Gimme Gimmes (often shortened to just Me First or the Gimmes) are a punk rock supergroup and cover band that formed in San Francisco in 1995. The band's lineup consists of Spike Slawson, Fat Mike, Joey Cape, and Dave Raun. Chris Shiflett is a former member.

The Gimmes work exclusively as a cover band. They specialize in rapid-fire punk interpretations of a wide range of songs, often with a humorous edge. 

The band is named after a children's book of the same name by Gerald G. Jampolsky and Diane V. Cirincione.

History
The band's first release came with 1995's Denver, a 7" single released on band member Fat Mike's record label Fat Wreck Chords, featuring two John Denver covers. The band released four more singles in 1996 and 1997, each on a different label and named after the artist covered on that particular release, as well as some compilation appearances. Their first full-length album, Have a Ball, was released July 29, 1997, and is still their best-selling record.

Each album by the band has a different theme: Have a Ball focuses on classic 1960s, 1970s, and early 1980s songs by singer/songwriters like Elton John, Neil Diamond, and John Denver; Are a Drag consists entirely of show tunes; Blow in the Wind of 60s classics; Take a Break of contemporary R&B songs (by artists such as Boyz 2 Men, Lionel Richie, and Vanessa L. Williams). Their fifth album Ruin Jonny's Bar Mitzvah (recorded live at a bar mitzvah) consists of pop music from the 1960s through the 1980s by artists such as REO Speedwagon, Styx and The Beatles, as well as traditional songs like "Hava Nagila". The compilation album Have Another Ball! features 60's-80's classics.

The band entered the studio on April 3, 2006 to work on their sixth album, Love Their Country, which was released on October 17, 2006. The theme of this album is country and western, and includes covers of tracks by Dixie Chicks, Garth Brooks, Hank Williams, Sr. and Johnny Cash. Prior to the release of the album, Fat Wreck Chords released a digital label sampler, iFloyd which included "(Ghost) Riders in the Sky" by the band.

In late 2006, Fat Wreck Chords released another digital label sampler Christmas Bonus, containing a previously-unreleased cover of Steve Goodman's "City of New Orleans". In August 2006 Me First and the Gimme Gimmes were scheduled to play three dates at PNC Park after Pirates games, but after they got booed on the first night, the next two nights were cancelled. They were to play along with fireworks during the post-game "Skyblast" shows.

On December 5, 2007, Fat Wreck Chords released a flash MP3 holiday bonus sampler called Hanuk-Comp containing "The Boxer", originally released on the 1997 Garf single. There is also a downloadable podcast that features commentary from Fat Mike and Floyd during breaks between songs in which the next album is revealed. The compilation Have Another Ball! was released on July 8, 2008; it comprises all the B-side recordings from the Have a Ball singles, plus covers of "Sodomy" (from Hair) and Diana Ross's "Theme from Mahogany (Do You Know Where You're Going To)".

Fat Wreck Chords released Go Down Under on February 1, 2011, featuring covers of five songs by Australian artists. On September 13, 2011 (in anticipation of a tour of Japan) Fat Wreck Chords released a 5-song EP, Sing in Japanese.

In a Reddit AMA on January 28, 2014, Fat Mike revealed the next album theme would be "Divas". Featuring covers of Barbra Streisand, Christina Aguilera and Lady Gaga, Are We Not Men? We Are Diva! was released on May 13, 2014 on Fat Wreck Chords.

On November 30, 2018, they released a cover of "Santa Baby".

On June 7, 2019, Chris Shiflett took part in a Reddit AMA. When asked about The Gimmes he revealed he is "No longer involved", although he did not specify exactly when he left the band. He noted that "When the Gimmes decided to start releasing songs that I didn't play on it was time for me to leave", adding in another comment that it was "on bad terms".

In May 2021, the band announced a livestream event called Saturday Night Special. The lineup for the show will be Spike Slawson, Joey Cape, Scott Shiflett, CJ Ramone, and Pinch, with Fat Mike making a guest appearance.

Members

 Spike Slawson (of Swingin' Utters and Re-Volts) – lead vocals (1995-present)
 Fat Mike (of NOFX) – bass, backing vocals (1995-present)
 Joey Cape (of Lagwagon) – guitar, backing vocals (1995-present)
 Dave Raun (of Lagwagon and RKL) – drums (1995-present)

Past members
 Chris Shiflett (of Foo Fighters and No Use for a Name) – guitar, backing vocals (1995-2019)

"Fill-in" members for tours
 Brian Baker (of Minor Threat and Bad Religion) filled in for Shiflett in 2006.
 Chris Shiflett's brother, Scott Shiflett (of Face to Face and Viva Death), has been filling in for him on the band's most recent tours.
 NOFX guitarist Eric Melvin filled in for Fat Mike on bass during the 2007 European tour and 2008 and 2013 Australian tours.
 Adam Stern from Youth Brigade and Royal Crown Revue filled in for Fat Mike on bass; Mark Mortenson from Screw 32 filled in for Dave Raun on drums; Grant McIntire also from Screw 32 filled in for Joey Cape on Guitar; and Barry d'live Ward from Rich Kids on LSD and Crosstops filled in for Chris Shiflett on guitar during the 1996 Tour.
 Warren Fitzgerald of The Vandals & Lindsay McDougall of Frenzal Rhomb filled in on guitars during the band's participation in the 2003 Livid Festival in Australia.
 Since 2014, Jay Bentley of Bad Religion has been the usual "fill-in" member on bass for Fat Mike.
 On the Spring 2017 tour, Chris Cheney of The Living End and also Lindsay McDougall of Frenzal Rhomb filled in on guitar for Chris Shiflett.
 On their first South America tour in April 2018, Lindsay McDougall of Frenzal Rhomb filled in on guitar for Chris Shiflett.
 Christopher Ward, aka CJ Ramone joined for the 2018 Summer Tour. Invited by Jay Bentley. CJ was back again on 9/8/21 in Columbus, OH to launch a tour opening for Violent Femmes and Flogging Molly. CJ was back for the 2023 Australian tour. And a crowd favourite. 
 Stacey Dee of Bad Cop/Bad Cop fills in for Joey Cape on (at least some) dates on the European Tour 2019, while Lindsay McDougall of Frenzal Rhomb returned to cover for Scott Shiflett.
 John "The Swami" Reis of Rocket from the Crypt. On 9/8/21 he made his debut opening for Violent Femmes and Flogging Moly. Swami was also a member of their Australian tour in 2023.  Spike was the only original Gimme.(correction, Joey Cape was part of the tour as well)
 Andrew "Pinch" Pinching, drummer for The Damned. On 9/8/21 he was a Gimme in Columbus, Ohio. On 10/22/22 he was a Gimme in Fort Lauderdale, Florida
 Jonny "2 Bags" Wickersham of Social Distortion. On 9/8/21 he was a Gimme in Columbus, Ohio.

Costumes
The Gimmes have a gimmick of wearing quirky matching costumes during their live shows. They have also worn pajamas, red suits, cheerleader outfits, shiny suits and fezzes, and, during one show in Camden, NJ on the Warped Tour, dressed as the band AFI (who in turn dressed as The Gimmes). Easily the most common and popular costume set are their matching Hawaiian shirts of varying styles and colors over the years.

Discography

Albums
 Have a Ball (1997)
 Are a Drag (1999)
 Blow in the Wind (2001)
 Take a Break (2003)
 Ruin Jonny's Bar Mitzvah (2004)
 Love Their Country (2006)
 Have Another Ball (2008)
 Sing in Japanese (2011)
 Are We Not Men? We Are Diva! (2014)
 Rake it In: The Greatestest Hits (2017)

References

External links

Fat Wreck Chords label official web site
 
Audio interview with Fat Mike and Joey Cape
Me First and the Gimme Gimmes Live Review

 
Cover bands
Fat Wreck Chords artists
Musical groups established in 1995
Pop punk groups from California
Punk rock groups from California
Rock music supergroups
American supergroups